Clement Roy Nichols, of Kew, Victoria was an Australian Boy Scouts Association Scouting senior official.

Nichols served on the World Scout Committee of the World Organization of the Scout Movement from 1959 to 1965 and again from 1967 to 1973.

Nichols was awarded the Bronze Wolf, the only distinction of the World Organization of the Scout Movement, awarded by the World Scout Committee for exceptional services to world Scouting, in 1965. He received the Companion of the Order of St Michael and St George (CMG) during the 1970 New Year Honours, for services to the Australian Boy Scouts Association.

References

External links

Recipients of the Bronze Wolf Award
World Scout Committee members
Scouting and Guiding in Australia
Year of birth missing
People from Kew, Victoria